Ricardo Armando Bralo Gil (born 28 August 1916) is an Argentine retired long-distance runner from Buenos Aires, who won the gold medal in the men's 5000 metres event at the 1951 Pan American Games. He represented his native country at the 1948 Summer Olympics in London, United Kingdom.

References
 sports-reference

External links
 

1916 births
Possibly living people
Athletes from Buenos Aires
Argentine male long-distance runners
Athletes (track and field) at the 1951 Pan American Games
Athletes (track and field) at the 1948 Summer Olympics
Olympic athletes of Argentina
Pan American Games gold medalists for Argentina
Pan American Games medalists in athletics (track and field)
Medalists at the 1951 Pan American Games